The grapheme Š, š (S with caron) is used in various contexts representing the sh sound like in the word show, usually denoting the voiceless postalveolar fricative /ʃ/ or similar voiceless retroflex fricative /ʂ/. In the International Phonetic Alphabet this sound is denoted with ʃ or ʂ, but the lowercase š is used in the Americanist phonetic notation, as well as in the Uralic Phonetic Alphabet. It represents the same sound as the Turkic letter Ş and the Romanian letter Ș (S-comma).

For use in computer systems, Š and š are at Unicode codepoints U+0160 and U+0161 (Alt 0138 and Alt 0154 for input), respectively. In HTML code, the entities &Scaron; and &scaron; can also be used to represent the characters.

Primary usage
The symbol originates with the 15th-century Czech alphabet as introduced by the reforms of Jan Hus. From there, it was first adopted into the Croatian alphabet by Ljudevit Gaj in 1830 to represent the same sound, and from there on into other orthographies, such as Latvian, Lithuanian, Slovak, Slovene, Karelian, Sami, Veps and Sorbian. 

Some orthographies such as Bulgarian Cyrillic, Macedonian Cyrillic and Serbian Cyrillic use the "ш" letter which represents the sound "š" would represent in Latin alphabets. Moreover, Bosnian, Serbian, Croatian, and Montenegrin standard languages adopted the Gaj's Croatian alphabet alongside Cyrillic thereby adopting "š", while the same alphabet is used for Romanization of Macedonian. Certain variants of Belarusian Latin and Bulgarian Latin also use the letter.

In Finnish and Estonian, š occurs only in loanwords. On occasion, it is possible to replace š with sh but only when it is technically impossible to typeset the accented character.

Polish and Hungarian do not use š. Polish instead uses the digraph sz and Hungarian uses the basic latin letter s, while the digraph sz equals to most other languages' letter s.

Outside of Europe, Syriac Latin adopted the letter but it, alongside other letters with diacritics, is rarely used. The alphabet is not used natively to write the language; Syriac alphabet is used instead. It is used in Lakota, Cheyenne, and Cree (in dialects such as Moose Cree), Classical Malay (until end of 19th century) and some African languages such as Northern Sotho and Songhay. It is used in the Persian  Latin (Rumi) alphabet, equivalent to ش.

Transliteration
The symbol is also used as the romanisation of Cyrillic ш in ISO 9 and scientific transliteration and deployed in the Latinic writing systems of Macedonian, Bulgarian, Serbian, Belarusian, Ukrainian, and Bashkir. It is also used in some systems of transliterating Georgian to represent .

Computing code

See also
Ш, ш – Sha (Cyrillic)
Sz (digraph)
Ś
ʃ – Esh (letter)
Caron
Shin (letter)
Voiceless palato-alveolar sibilant
Ș
Ş

References

Sources
 

Latin letters with diacritics
Phonetic transcription symbols
Lithuanian language
Croatian language
Serbian language
Eastern Aramaic languages
Neo-Aramaic languages